Weltstadthaus is the name of several Peek & Cloppenburg stores:
 Weltstadthaus (Cologne)
 Weltstadthaus (Vienna)